Waverly is a home rule-class city in Union County, Kentucky, United States. The population was 297 at the 2000 census. Founded in 1870, the city was named for founder Hugh McElroy's nephew.

Geography
Waverly is located at  (37.709738, -87.815278).

Demographics

As of the census of 2000, there were 297 people, 126 households, and 85 families residing in the city. The racial makeup of the city was 94.28% White and 5.72% African American. Hispanic or Latino of any race were 0.34% of the population.

There were 126 households, out of which 27.8% had children under the age of 18 living with them, 57.9% were married couples living together, 7.9% had a female householder with no husband present, and 32.5% were non-families. 28.6% of all households were made up of individuals, and 18.3% had someone living alone who was 65 years of age or older. The average household size was 2.36 and the average family size was 2.92.

In the city, the population was spread out, with 21.2% under the age of 18, 9.1% from 18 to 24, 29.3% from 25 to 44, 24.2% from 45 to 64, and 16.2% who were 65 years of age or older. The median age was 38 years. For every 100 females, there were 86.8 males. For every 100 females age 18 and over, there were 88.7 males.

The median income for a household in the city was $33,438, and the median income for a family was $34,821. Males had a median income of $24,583 versus $21,136 for females. The per capita income for the city was $15,594. About 7.4% of families and 9.1% of the population were below the poverty line, including 18.3% of those under the age of eighteen and 4.2% of those 65 or over.

See also
George N. Proctor House

References

Populated places established in 1870
Cities in Union County, Kentucky
Cities in Kentucky
1870 establishments in Kentucky